Seaford Hundred is a hundred in Sussex County, Delaware, United States. Seaford Hundred was formed in 1869 from Northwest Fork Hundred. Its primary community is Seaford.

References

External links
 Old Seaford Post Office, 
 Seaford, 
 Seaford Fire Department, 

Hundreds in Sussex County, Delaware